The Grammy Award for Best Rock Performance is an award presented at the Grammy Awards, a ceremony that was established in 1958 and originally called the Gramophone Awards. According to the 54th Grammy Awards description guide it is designed for solo, duo/groups or collaborative (vocal or instrumental) rock recordings and is limited to singles or tracks only.

This award combines the previous categories for Best Solo Rock Vocal Performance, Best Rock Performance by a Duo or Group with Vocal and Best Rock Instrumental Performance. The restructuring of these categories was a result of the Recording Academy's wish to decrease the list of categories and awards and to eliminate the distinctions between solo and duo/groups performances. The Academy argued that any distinction between these performances is difficult to make, as "four-fifths of rock acts are groups, and even solo rock acts tend to be backed by a band".

The award goes to the artist. The producer, engineer and songwriter can apply for a Winners Certificate.

From 2014, this category has also included hard rock performances that were previously screened in the Best Hard Rock Performance and Best Hard Rock/Metal Performance categories, which are now defunct.

Recipients

Artists with multiple nominations

6 nominations
Brittany Howard (4 with Alabama Shakes)

4 nominations
Alabama Shakes
Foo Fighters

3 nominations
The Black Keys
Chris Cornell
Jack White

2 nominations
 Arctic Monkeys
 Beck
 David Bowie
 Coldplay
 Mumford & Sons

See also
Grammy Award for Best Female Rock Vocal Performance
Grammy Award for Best Male Rock Vocal Performance
Grammy Award for Best Solo Rock Vocal Performance
Grammy Award for Best Rock Performance by a Duo or Group with Vocal
Grammy Award for Best Hard Rock Performance
Grammy Award for Best Metal Performance
Grammy Award for Best Rock Instrumental Performance
Grammy Award for Best Rock Song

References

External links 
 Official Site of the Grammy Awards

Grammy Awards for rock music
Rock Performance